St Michael and All Angels’ Church, Kniveton is a Grade I listed parish church in the Church of England in Kniveton, Derbyshire.

History

The church was originally a chapelry to St Oswald's church in Ashbourne and was dedicated to St John the Baptist.

It has Norman origins as evidenced in the plain semi-circular arch of the porch. It is sited on a small hill, built of coursed rubble gritstone with ashlar dressings in the Early English style and dates from the 13th century; it consists of chancel, nave, south porch and a low embattled western tower with a short spire. At some point in its history the dedication changed to St Michael and All Angels.

The church was repewed in 1842.

Bells

The tower has two 17th-century bells, one dated 1665 inscribed “God save the King, 1665” and has the mark of George Oldfield. The second has round the hanuch three Lambaric capital S's alternating with three cross fleurys, and the bellmark generally attributed to Richard Mellour of Nottingham.

Parish status

The church is in a joint parish with
St Philip & St James' Church, Atlow
All Saints' Church, Bradley
St Bartholomew's Church, Hognaston
Christ Church, Hulland Ward

See also
Grade I listed churches in Derbyshire
Grade I listed buildings in Derbyshire
Listed buildings in Kniveton

References

External links

Church of England church buildings in Derbyshire
Grade I listed churches in Derbyshire